Major General François-Louis Lessard,  (December 9, 1860 – August 7, 1927) was a Canadian Army officer, most known for his service during the Second Boer War.

Biography 
Born in Quebec City, the son of Louis-Napoléon Lessard and Jane Felicity McCutcheon, Lessard was educated at the Collège Saint-Thomas in Montmagny and the Académie Commerciale de Québec. In 1880, he entered the Quebec Garrison Artillery as a second lieutenant. In 1884, he joined the Cavalry School Corps (now Royal Canadian Dragoons) and participated in the North-West Rebellion in 1885, although his unit did not see combat. He was promoted to captain in 1888 and major in 1894. In 1896, he was made Inspector of Cavalry for the Dominion of Canada. In 1898, he was promoted to lieutenant colonel and placed in command of the Royal Canadian Dragoons. He took part in the Second Boer War and was later made a Companion of the Order of the Bath by King Edward VII in recognition of his services.

Lessard returned to Canada in 1901 and was appointed Adjutant-General of the Canadian Militia in 1907. He was promoted to colonel in 1907, brigadier general in 1911, and major general in 1912. He was a director of the Canadian National Exhibition. He retired in 1919 and settled in Meadowvale, Ontario, where he died of stomach cancer in 1927. A Roman Catholic, he was buried in Mount Hope Catholic Cemetery in Toronto.

References
 

1860 births
1927 deaths
Canadian generals
Canadian military personnel of the Second Boer War
Canadian Companions of the Order of the Bath
Deaths from stomach cancer
French Quebecers
Canadian Roman Catholics
19th-century Roman Catholics
20th-century Roman Catholics
Royal Canadian Dragoons officers
Deaths from cancer in Ontario
Canadian Militia officers